The Empire Hotel is a boutique hotel located along West 63rd Street (at Broadway), in the New York City borough of Manhattan. The Empire Hotel has 426 guestrooms, including 50 suites.

History

In 1889, a seven-story building rose from the ground that would later become The Empire Hotel. Herbert DuPuy purchased this building in 1908. In 1922, DuPuy decided to tear the original structure down and build a 15-story building.

On December 5, 1923, The Empire Hotel opened with its iconic red neon signage reading "Hotel Empire" erected on the rooftop. Room pricing was vastly in contrast to current numbers. Room rates in 1935: $2.00 per day – a room with private toilet and lavatory for one person; $2.50 per day – a room with private toilet and lavatory for two people; $3.00 per day – a room with private bath for one person; $3.50 per day – a room with private baths for two people; $5.00 per day – suites of parlor, bedroom and bath. Garage service in 1935: garage storage for guest car 50 cents per day, service to and from hotel 25 cents each way. The General Manager in 1935 was Edward B. Bell.

In 1938 Patrick J. Murphy was hired as the Resident Manager. The next year Guy P. Seeley was hired as the Resident Manager and Otis H. Culver was hired as Assistant Manager. 1943 brought Daniel H. McCarriagher as the new owner. Transitioning to the 50s, ownership shifted to Leslie L. Paul, who also owned Plymouth Hotel. During this time the hotel was redecorated and there was a construction of a new dining room on the lobby floor as well as an air-conditioned cocktail lounge and coffee shop.

The New York hotel was untouched from when it was rebuilt in 1922 until it received a refurbishment in 2007 by interior designers Goodman Charlton.

In media
The Empire Hotel was featured prominently throughout The CW's teen drama series Gossip Girl, being owned by the character Chuck Bass (Ed Westwick). In January 2010, it was reported that the hotel had seen a five- to 10-percent increase in bookings due to the exposure it gained from the show. A menu with Gossip Girl-themed cocktails was also created.

The hotel was also featured in the pilot episode of the Starz crime drama series Power, where Ghost (Omari Hardwick) meets Felipe Lobos (Enrique Murciano). The hotel was also featured in three "letter hoisting" films in the 70's for Sesame Street.

The red neon sign that shines into Kramer’s apartment in an episode of Seinfeld parodies, and was inspired by, the Empire Hotel's sign.

References

External links
 
 

1922 establishments in New York City
Broadway (Manhattan)
Gossip Girl
Hotel buildings completed in 1923
Hotels established in 1923
Hotels in Manhattan
Upper West Side